Whalen is a surname. In Ireland, Whalen, Whelan, Phelan and O'Phelan, are anglicized variants of the same Gaelic surname, Faoláin, which itself is a variant of Ó Faoileáin and Ó Haoláin.

It may refer to:

People

Bob Whalen, American college baseball coach
Bruce Whalen, American politician
Charles W. Whalen, Jr., American politician
Diana Whalen, Canadian politician
Dianne Whalen, Canadian politician
Douglas Whalen, American linguist
Ed Whalen (broadcaster), Canadian television personality
Grover Whalen, American politician and businessman
Jack Whalen, American hitman
James Henry Whalen, Canadian pilot
James J. Whalen, American psychologist
Jennifer Whalen, American mountain bike racer
Jennifer R Whalen, Canadian actor and comedian
Jill Whalen, American search engine optimization consultant
Jim Whalen, American football player
Joe Whalen, American tennis player
John S. Whalen, American politician
Laurence Whalen, American judge
Lindsay Whalen, American professional basketball player
Megan Whalen Turner, American author
Michael James Whalen, American composer 
Philip Whalen, American poet
Rob Whalen, American baseball player
Sara Whalen (born 1976), American Olympic soccer player
Sean Whalen (born 1964), American actor and writer
Stephen Thomas Whalen (born 1968 new brunswick) known as Canadian Country music Artist Steve Waylon
Thomas Michael Whalen III, American politician
Vermel Whalen, American politician

Fictional characters
Patrick Whalen, A character in The Sopranos

Places
In Britain, Whalen is an old English-language spelling for the village Uelen.

Songs
 Jimmy Whalen, a song by Peter, Paul and Mary from A Song Will Rise

See also
 Whalan
 Uelen

Anglicised Irish-language surnames